

Shrivatsa Goswami (born 27 October 1950) is an Indian Indologist scholar as well as Gaudiya Vaishnava religious leader.

He was born in the holy Vaishnava pilgrimage site of Vrindavan, into a brahmin family whose members were caretakers of Radha Raman Temple for more than four centuries, one of the most famous Vrindavan temples, founded by Chaitanya's associate, the saint Gopala Bhatta Goswami. Shrivatsa Goswami's father, Purushottam Goswami, was the temple leading priest. In accordance with the family tradition, Shrivatsa Goswami became the acharya of Radha Raman temple. In 1972, he founded a scientific and cultural organization, the "Sri Caitanya Prema Samsthana", to the propagation of traditional Vaishnavism, patronised the arts (Raslila dance and other) and scholarship on Vaishnavism, aspecially in Vrindavan.

Shrivatsa Goswami is a graduate in philosophy of the Banares Hindu University, where he later has taught philosophy and religion. In the mid-1970s he was a visiting scholar at the Harvard Divinity School's Center for the Study of World Religions. Shrivatsa Goswami has been associated with the Indian Council of Philosophical Research (a member of the board of editors of the Encyclopedia of Indian Philosophers) and the Indira Gandhi National Centre for the Arts (that is a sponsor for his Vraja Research Project). His scholarly publications in India and the West focus on Vaishnavite philosophy and theology, as well as theater and other aspects of the religious culture of the Braj region.

In addition, Shrivatsa Goswami works in the field of interfaith cooperation. Thus, he is the honorary president of Religions for Peace. And Pope Benedict XVI invited him to represent Hinduism at the 25th anniversary of the World Day of Prayer at Assisi in October 2011.

Selected works 
Books
 
 

Contributions
 
 
 
 
 

 Co-editor

References

Further reading

External links 
 
 
 About the Sri Caitanya Prema Samsthana. Archived from Gambhira.com

Living people
1950 births
20th-century Hindu philosophers and theologians
21st-century Hindu philosophers and theologians
20th-century Hindu religious leaders
21st-century Hindu religious leaders
Acharyas
Devotees of Krishna
Gaudiya religious leaders
Hindu studies scholars
Indian Indologists
Indian theologians
Indian Hindu religious leaders
Indian Vaishnavites
Kirtan performers
People in interfaith dialogue
Scholars from Uttar Pradesh
Banaras Hindu University alumni
Academic staff of Banaras Hindu University
People from Mathura district
Recipients of the Sangeet Natak Akademi Award